Villapol is a surname. Notable people with the surname include:

Fernando Villapol (born 1953), Spanish sculptor, museum curator and art critic
Manuel Villapol (born 1956), Puerto Rican wrestler
María Villapol (born 1967), Venezuelan judoka
Nitza Villapol (1923–1998), Cuban chef, cookbook writer and television host